Lard is pig fat.

Lard may also refer to:

Persons 
 Lard (surname)

Place names 
 Rivière au Lard, a tributary of the Champlain River in Mauricie, Quebec, Canada
 Lard, Iran (disambiguation), villages in Iran

Arts 
 Keith Lard, a fictional character in That Peter Kay Thing television series
 Marc Riley (b. 1961), British musician formerly known by the pseudonym Lard
 Lard (band), a U.S. hardcore punk/industrial band

See also 
 Lardon, a small strip or cube of pork fat
 Laird, a heritable title in Scotland